Critical Reviews in Food Science and Nutrition is a food science journal published monthly by Taylor & Francis. It was originally established in 1970 as Critical Reviews in Food Technology, but changed to its current name in 1975. The editor-in-chief is Fergus M. Clydesdale (University of Massachusetts Amherst). According to the Journal Citation Reports, the journal has a 2019 impact factor of 7.860, ranking it 3rd out of 89 journals in the category "Nutrition and Dietetics" and 4th out of 139 journals in the category "Food Science and Technology".

References

External links

Nutrition and dietetics journals
Taylor & Francis academic journals
Monthly journals
Review journals
Publications established in 1970
English-language journals
Food science journals